Kaszanka is a traditional blood sausage in the east and central European cuisine. It is made of a mixture of pig's blood, pork offal (commonly liver), and buckwheat  (kasza) or barley stuffed in a pig intestine. It is usually flavored with onion, black pepper, and marjoram.

The dish probably comes from Germany or Denmark, but the latter is unlikely because of a significant difference in ingredients: the Danish version consists of blood, pork, raisins, sugar, groats and flour.

Kaszanka may be eaten cold, but traditionally it is either grilled or fried with some onions and then served with potato and sauerkraut.

Other names and similar dishes

 крывянка (Kryvianka, Belarus)
 verivorst (Estonia)
 kaszanka (Poland)
 Kiszka (Yiddish קישקע kishke, some districts of Poland)
 Grützwurst (Germany and sometimes Silesia)
 Tote Oma (Germany. A joking-sarcastic name for fried Grützwurst, meaning Dead Granny)
 Knipp (Lower Saxony, Germany)
Göttwust, Grüttwust (Low Germany)
 krupńok, krupniok (More of a slight name difference than variation, Silesia)
 żymlok (A variation of Krupniok based on cut bread roll instead of buckwheat, Silesia)
 Pinkel (Northwest Germany)
 Stippgrütze (Westphalia, Germany)
 Westfälische Rinderwurst (Westphalia, Germany)
krëpnica (Kashubia)
 Maischel (Carinthia, Austria): Grützwurst without blood and not cased in intestine, but worked into balls in caul fat. The name comes from the Slovenian majželj in turn derived from the Bavarian Maisen ("slices"). 
 jelito (Czech Republic)
 krvavnička (Slovakia)
 hurka (Slovakia)
 véres hurka (Hungarian)
 krovyanka (Ukraine)
 krvavica (Serbia, Slovenia)
 кървавица (Bulgaria)
 chișcă (Romania)

See also
 Kishka
 Ryynimakkara
 Saumagen
 Black pudding
 Haggis
 Polish cuisine
 German cuisine

References

External links
A photograph of kaszanka
A recipe for kiszka on YumYum.com
Kaszanka or kiszka vendors in the United States: Chicopee Provision Co. (Chicopee, MA), Polana – A Polish Experience (Chicago, IL)
Krupniok in Silesian cuisine

Belarusian cuisine
Silesian cuisine
Czech cuisine
Slovak cuisine
German sausages
Polish sausages
Blood sausages
Meat and grain sausages
Precooked sausages